Chungju (충주시) is a city in North Chungcheong province, South Korea. Uamsan is a mountain located within the outskirts of the city.

The city is famous for the annual martial arts festival held in October. Also of note, former UN Secretary-General, Ban Ki-moon grew up here.

Symbol
The city's symbols include the chrysanthemum (as the city flower), Mandarin duck (city bird) and apple tree (city tree).

History

During Hideyoshi's Invasions of Korea Chungju was the site of the Battle of Chungju, where the Korean general Shin Rip was defeated by the Japanese general Konishi Yukinaga. This defeat resulted in King Seonjo fleeing from Hanseong (Seoul) to Pyongyang.

Chungju Lake
Chungju Dam is the country's biggest multi-purpose dam that links together Chungju and its neighborhoods. It creates a manmade lake with a vast body of water.

Woraksan Mt and Songnae valley are located nearby. Additionally, this area has cherished cave area/springs.

2013 World Rowing Championships
The 2013 World Rowing Championships were held at Tangeum Lake, Chungju between August 25 – September 1.

Olympic and Paralympic Qualification Regatta
It had been intended that the Asia and Oceania Qualification Regatta for the 2020 Olympic and Paralympic Games would be held there from April 27 to 30, but it was cancelled because of the coronavirus outbreak.

Products
Chungju is famous for its production of apples. The principal reasons being because of the large amount of daylight received and high difference of temperatures. The growing of apples started 300 years ago from China and it was 1912 when the city officially began to plant trees. As of 2009, apple cultivation area is 1,871 ha and production amount is 41,592. The production of apple is 44.6% in Chungcheongbuk-do (as of 2009). The scale is the greatest in Chungcheongbuk-do.

Education
There are two universities in Chungju: Konkuk University (Chungju campus) and Korea National University of Transportation (formed by the 2012 merger of Chungju National University and Korea National Railroad College). As well as being the home to these two Universities, Chungju also has many primary, middle and high schools with excellent classroom facilities.

There is one international school, Chungju Chinese Elementary School.

Climate
Chungju has a monsoon-influenced humid continental climate (Köppen: Dwa) with cold, dry winters and hot, rainy summers.

Sister cities

Notable people

 Ban Ki-Moon, UN Secretary-General 
 Lee Seung-hyo (Hangul: 이승효), actor
 Lee Geung-young (Hangul: 이경영), actor
 Park Jung-min (Hangul: 박정민), actor
 Jinyoung (Real Name: Jung Jin-young, Hangul: 정진영), singer-songwriter, dancer, record producer, model, actor, MC and K-pop idol, former leader and member of K-pop boygroup B1A4
 Kwangchul Youn (born 1966), South Korean operatic bass and academic voice teacher
 Kim Junkyu (Hangul: 김준규), (born: September 9, 2000). Singer, dancer, child model and main vocalist member of K-pop idol boygroup TREASURE from YG Entertainment.

See also
 List of cities in South Korea
 Tangeum Lake
 People Power Party (South Korea)

References

External links

City government home pagen (in English)
City government home page (in Korean)

 
Cities in North Chungcheong Province